This page is a list of the episodes of The Outer Limits, a U.S. science fiction television series originally aired on the ABC television network for two seasons from 1963 to 1965.

Series overview

Episodes

Season 1 (1963–64)

Season 2 (1964–65)

Home releases 
The following DVD sets were released by MGM Home Entertainment.

References

External links
 

 
 
Outer Limits, The
Outer Limits, The